

308001–308100 

|-bgcolor=#f2f2f2
| colspan=4 align=center | 
|}

308101–308200 

|-id=197
| 308197 Satrapi ||  || Marjane Satrapi (born 1969), an Iranian-born French graphic novelist, illustrator, film director, and children's book author || 
|}

308201–308300 

|-bgcolor=#f2f2f2
| colspan=4 align=center | 
|}

308301–308400 

|-id=306
| 308306 Dainere ||  || Dainere Monique Anthoney (born 1998), an inspiring Australian teenager, author and blogger who raises awareness and funds for brain tumour research. || 
|}

308401–308500 

|-bgcolor=#f2f2f2
| colspan=4 align=center | 
|}

308501–308600 

|-bgcolor=#f2f2f2
| colspan=4 align=center | 
|}

308601–308700 

|-id=680
| 308680 McLennan ||  || Ian C. McLennan (born 1938) was the founding director of the Queen Elizabeth Planetarium in Edmonton, Alberta, Canada, and for the last 60 years has provided extensive experience in public project planning and administration in cultural and educational organizations. || 
|}

308701–308800 

|-id=798
| 308798 Teo ||  || Teodoro "Teo" Encinar (born 1952) built, according to the discoverer's design, the La Cañada Observatory, Spain, over the summer of 2002. || 
|}

308801–308900 

|-id=825
| 308825 Siksika ||  || Siksika Nation, which is one of the three First Nations, with the Piikani (Peigan) and Kainai (Blood), that comprise the Blackfoot Confederacy. || 
|-id=856
| 308856 Daniket ||  || Daniela Ketskarova Masiero (born 2015), daughter of American discoverer Joseph Masiero || 
|}

308901–309000 

|-bgcolor=#f2f2f2
| colspan=4 align=center | 
|}

References 

308001-309000